The 103rd Commando Division were the special forces of the Ethiopian army under the People's Democratic Republic of Ethiopia. It was activated and began training in January 1987. It was part of the 604th Corps and was described as "the cream of the Ethiopian Army.

Creation 
In early 1987, the government began the process of expanding commando units. The division was created on 13 January 1987, with at its head Colonel Getahun Wolde Giorgis. It was based out of Bahir Dar, Amhara Region with a potential capacity of 10,000 commandos. After initial recruitment, training began at the Harar Military Academy, before commando training began at Hawassa and later at Bahir Dar.

Operations 
In 1989, the Defence Council sent the 103rd to take part in the defence of the capital during the Fall of Addis Ababa during the Ethiopian Civil War. It also took part in the battles for Axum.

In Tigray, the 103rd Commando Division was to provide the government's last hope in keeping Tigray. These attempts were repulsed on 19 February 1989, the division was defeated in and around Shire by the Tigray People's Liberation Front.

Personnel 
The 103rd during its existence was often seen as a victim of poor command, as it was mostly made up of conscripts and fresh militiamen. General Demissie Bulto, who was involved in the 1989 Ethiopian coup d'état attempt, had his mutilated body dragged in the streets of Asmara by half-drunk commandos. Major Bogale was a brigade commander in the division.

References

Works cited
 

Military units and formations of Ethiopia
Military units and formations established in 1987
1980s establishments in Ethiopia